The Estonian Mixed Curling Championship is the national championship of men's mixed curling teams in Estonia. It has been held annually since the 2003–2004 season to 2016–2017, and is organized by the Estonian Curling Association.

List of champions and medallists
Team line-ups shows in order: fourth, third, second, lead, alternate (if exists), coach (if exists); skips marked bold.

See also
Estonian Men's Curling Championship
Estonian Women's Curling Championship
Estonian Mixed Doubles Curling Championship

References

Curling competitions in Estonia
Recurring sporting events established in 2004
2004 establishments in Estonia
Sports leagues disestablished in 2018
National curling championships
Mixed curling
National championships in Estonia